The 1982 California Attorney General election was held on November 2, 1982. Democratic nominee John Van de Kamp defeated Republican nominee George Nicholson with 52.83% of the vote.

Primary elections
Primary elections were held on June 8, 1982.

Democratic primary

Candidates
John Van de Kamp, former Los Angeles County District Attorney
Omer Rains, State Senator

Results

Republican primary

Candidates
George Nicholson, attorney
M. David Stirling, State Assemblyman

Results

General election

Candidates
Major party candidates
John Van de Kamp, Democratic
George Nicholson, Republican

Other candidates
Bartholomew "Bert" Lee, Libertarian
Dan Siegel, Peace and Freedom

Results

References

1982
Attorney General
California